The Lytham St. Annes Corporation Tramways and its predecessor companies operated an electric tramway service in Lytham St Annes between 1903 and 1937.

History

Tramway schemes in Lytham St. Annes had been proposed since 1878, but no progress was made until The Blackpool, St. Annes and Lytham Tramway Order of 1896. Under this order, a tramway was constructed from the terminus of the Blackpool tramway at South Shore Railway Station. The new line opened on 11 July 1896, operated by the British Gas Traction Company. The extension to Lytham opened in February 1897, and the fleet of compressed coal gas trams eventually reached 20. The gas powered trams were not successful, and horse cars were also obtained. The scheme was eventually unsuccessful and the company sold out.

The Blackpool, St. Annes and Lytham Tramways Company purchased the assets of the former company for £115,000, and in 1900 an act authorised an electric tramway to rebuild the route. The newly electrified tramway was opened on 28 May 1903.

On 28 October 1920 St. Annes Council purchased the assets of the company for £132,279. The trams were rebranded with the inscription "St Annes Council Tramways".

In 1922 the borough of Lytham St. Annes was incorporated. The trams were re-branded with "Lytham St. Annes" and later "Lytham St. Annes Corporation"

Future

It is hoped that the Blackpool Tramway could be extended south to Lytham St Anne's from the current terminus at Starr Gate.

Fleet

The company owned a maximum fleet of 56 cars. 
1-30 British Electric Car Company 1903
31-40 Brush Electric Machines 1905
41-50 English Electric 1924
51-54 English Electric 1924 (acquired 1933 from Dearne District)
55 Brush Electric Machines 1923 (acquired 1933 from Accrington)
56 Sheffield Corporation/rebuilt Preston Corporation (acquired August 1934 from Preston - was their No.30, No.42 prior to 1932)

Closure

The last tram between Lytham and St Annes ran in 1936. The remainder of the system closed on 28 April 1937.

References

Tram transport in England
1903 establishments in England
Lytham St Annes
Historic transport in Lancashire